The Lincoln catafalque is a catafalque hastily constructed in 1865 to support the casket of Abraham Lincoln while the president's body lay in state in the Capitol Rotunda in Washington, D.C. The catafalque has since been used for all those who have lain in state in the Capitol Rotunda. When not in use, the catafalque is kept in the United States Capitol Visitor Center in a small vaulted chamber. It was previously kept in an area called Washington's Tomb, which was originally intended, but never used, as the burial place for George Washington, the first President of the United States.

No law, written rule, or regulation specifies who may lie in state; use of the Rotunda is controlled by concurrent action of the House and Senate. Any person who has rendered distinguished service to the nation may lie in state if the family so wishes and Congress approves. In the case of unknown soldiers, the President or the appropriate branch of the armed forces initiates the action.

Senators and representatives have lain in state on the catafalque elsewhere in the Capitol. An example of this was when the catafalque was used for the six hours that Senator Robert C. Byrd lay in repose on the Senate floor on July 1, 2010. The catafalque has also been used nine times in the Supreme Court Building, for the lying in state of former Chief Justice Earl Warren on July 11–12, 1974; former Justice Thurgood Marshall, January 27, 1993; former Chief Justice Warren Earl Burger, June 28, 1995; former Justice William J. Brennan, Jr., July 28, 1997; Justice Harry A. Blackmun, March 8, 1999, Chief Justice William H. Rehnquist on September 6–7, 2005, Justice Antonin Scalia on February 19, 2016, Justice John Paul Stevens, July 22, 2019, and Justice Ruth Bader Ginsburg on September 23-24, 2020. In addition, it was used in the Department of Commerce building on April 9–10, 1996, for the lying in state of Secretary of Commerce Ronald H. Brown.

The catafalque is a simple bier of rough pine boards nailed together and covered with black cloth. Although the base and platform have occasionally been altered to accommodate the larger size of modern coffins and for the ease of the attending military personnel, it is basically the same today as it was in Lincoln's time. Although the cloth covering the catafalque has been replaced several times, the style of the drapery is similar to that used in 1865.

A list of those who have lain on the catafalque:

 Abraham Lincoln (April 19–21, 1865)
 Thaddeus Stevens (August 13–14, 1868)
 Charles Sumner (March 13, 1874)
 Henry Wilson (November 25–26, 1875)
 James A. Garfield (September 21–23, 1881)
 John Alexander Logan (December 30–31, 1886)
 William McKinley (September 17, 1901)
 Pierre Charles L'Enfant (April 28, 1909) reinterment
 George Dewey (January 20, 1917)
 Unknown Soldier of World War I (November 9–11, 1921)
 Warren G. Harding (August 8, 1923)
 William Howard Taft (March 11, 1930)
 John Joseph Pershing (July 18–19, 1948)
 Robert Alphonso Taft (August 2–3, 1953)
 Unknown Soldiers of World War II and the Korean War (May 28–30, 1958)
 John F. Kennedy (November 24–25, 1963)
 Douglas MacArthur (April 8–9, 1964)
 Herbert Hoover (October 23–25, 1964)
 Dwight D. Eisenhower (March 30–31, 1969)
 Everett McKinley Dirksen (September 9–10, 1969)
 J. Edgar Hoover (May 3–4, 1972)
 Lyndon B. Johnson (January 24–25, 1973)
 Hubert Humphrey (January 14–15, 1978)
 Unknown Soldier of Vietnam Era, later identified as Michael J. Blassie (May 25–28, 1984)
 Claude Denson Pepper (June 1–2, 1989)
 Thurgood Marshall (January 27, 1993)
 Ronald Reagan (June 9–11, 2004)
 William Rehnquist (September 6–7, 2005)
 Gerald Ford (December 30, 2006–January 2, 2007)
 Robert C. Byrd (July 1, 2010)
 Daniel Inouye (December 19–20, 2012)
 Frank Lautenberg (June 6, 2013)
 Antonin Scalia (February 19, 2016)
 John McCain (August 31, 2018)
 George H. W. Bush (December 3–5, 2018)
 John Paul Stevens (July 22, 2019)
 Elijah Cummings (October 25, 2019)
 John Lewis (July 27, 2020)
 Ruth Bader Ginsburg (September 23–25, 2020)
 William Evans (April 13, 2021)
 Bob Dole (December 9, 2021)

Notes 
1.Justice Ruth Bader Ginsburg had lain on the steps of the Supreme Court of the United States on September 23 and 24, 2020 and inside the United States Capitol on September 25, 2020 in the National Statuary Hall.

Sources

"Catafalque". Architect of the Capitol. Retrieved on September 30, 2009.

Assassination of Abraham Lincoln
United States Capitol grounds
Death customs